Lancaster High School is a high school in Lancaster, New York, United States that serves grades 9-12. It is operated by the Lancaster Central School District.

History 
Lancaster High School was established in 1894.

Former principals 
Previous assignment and reason for departure denoted in parentheses
Burt B. Farnsworth: 1894–1904
William J. Burr: 1904–1907
Levi L. Higley: 1907–1910
D.J. Zellman: 1910–1919
Nora A. Kinnicutt: 1919–1930
John J. White: 1930–1939
Frank Cosgrove: 1939–1941
Milton W. Brown: 1941–1945
H. William Kling: 1948–1964 (principal of Lancaster Junior High School, retired)
Larry A. Prince: 1964–1965 (principal of Silver Creek High School, resigned)
Leo Koeser: 1965
Oscar Roaldi: 1965–1990 (mathematics teacher at Lancaster High School, retired)
Daniel Paveljack: 1990–2011 (principal of Warsaw Central School, retired)
Cesar Marchioli: 2011–2021

Academics

Lancaster High School offers a wide variety of courses. Many are structured in a fashion that prepares students for the New York State Regents Examinations that are required by the state for graduation.  For students interested in a certain area of study, half- and full-year elective courses are offered in specific areas of study, such as Shakespeare and oceanography.

Advanced Placement courses
Lancaster High School offers 12 AP courses as of the 2010–11 school year. These courses include Calculus AB, Chemistry, Statistics, Biology, Music Theory, English Language, English Literature, US History, Spanish Language, U.S. Government & Politics, Macroeconomics, and Physics C.  Averages that students receive for these classes are weighted +1.07% to compensate for the advanced level of subject material covered.

Honors program
Lancaster High School has a large and varied program of honors classes. Some of these are Regents courses taken a year earlier than normal, while others teach more material at a faster rate than taught in courses that are not honors-level. Honors courses include World History, English (multiple years), Chemistry, Earth Science, and Precalculus. Each grade given for an honors-level course is weighted +1.04% to compensate for the accelerated curriculum.

Technology Department
Lancaster High School has a large selection of technology courses. In addition to traditional shop courses, the department teaches courses in architecture, computer graphics, electronics, and home repair, in addition to courses offered by the Project Lead the Way program.

Visual Arts Department
Lancaster has a large visual arts department. Examples of courses taught by the Visual Arts department include photography, art history, ceramics, and jewellery, video, and graphic design.

English Department
The English department of Lancaster High School offers many courses beyond the state-required yearly courses.  Courses on historical fiction, mythology, creative writing, journalism, drama, and Shakespeare are offered to expand students' views on literature and writing.

Math Department
The main offerings of the mathematics department are those required by New York for graduation.  Courses in introductory geometry, trigonometry, and precalculus are offered, in addition to courses on problem solving, SAT preparation, and life math.  For the students interested in advanced mathematics, course offerings include honors precalculus, AP Calculus, and AP Statistics.

Science Department
The science department's most popular courses are those required by New York for graduation, including courses in earth science, biology, and chemistry.  Students also have the opportunity to take courses focusing on physics, astronomy, meteorology, anatomy, and oceanography.  For the advanced student, Advanced Placement courses in biology, chemistry, and physics are offered.

Social Studies Department
The social studies department's main course offerings are courses on world history, United States history, government, and economics. Introductory psychology and criminal law courses are offered. Advanced Placement course offerings include United States history, American government, and macroeconomics.

Music
Lancaster's music department includes eight in-school performance groups, in addition to extra-curricular performing groups. In 2018, the Lancaster Central School District Music Department was named one of the best communities in America for Music Education by the NAMM Foundation.

Band Program
Lancaster High School has three bands that rehearse during school hours. The Concert Band is the entry-level band, the Wind Symphony is the mid-level band, and the Symphonic Band is the most prestigious. In 2010, all three attained a score of Gold or Gold with Distinction at their yearly NYSSMA evaluation. Lancaster also has a jazz ensemble and a successful marching band. In 2011 and 2013, the Lancaster High School Marching Redskins won the New York State Field Band Conference State Championship, Large School 2 division. The Lancaster Marching Redskins were officially promoted to the "National Class" of the New York State Field Band Conference on February 20, 2014.

Choral program
Lancaster has three in-school choral groups. Women's Choir is the entry level choir for girls, Mixed Choir is the entry level choir for boys and the mid-level choir for girls, and Concert Choir is the most prestigious. In 2011, Women's Choir and Mixed Choir attained a score of Gold at their NYSSMA evaluations, while Concert Choir attained Gold with Distinction. Out of school hours, the choral department has a show choir and a vocal jazz group. The Lancaster Men's Choir consists of the combined tenor and bass sections of both Mixed Choir and Concert Choir. The Lancaster Men's Choir attained a score of Gold at its 2011 NYSSMA evaluation.

Orchestras
Lancaster has two orchestras. The String Orchestra is the entry-level orchestra, and the Symphony Orchestra is the upper-level orchestra.

Musicals
The music department puts on a musical annually. Recent musicals include Cinderella (2020), Legally Blonde (2019), Sister Act (2018), Mary Poppins (2017), Crazy for You (2016), and The Little Mermaid (2015). In 1999, Lancaster's production of Fiddler on the Roof won the Kenny Award for Best Musical. In 2015, Lancaster was selected to produce a pilot production of The Little Mermaid.

Marching band
The Lancaster Central School District has two marching bands, one at the middle school level and one at the high school level. The Lancaster Middle Schools participates in many spring events such as the Holland Tulip Festival and parade pageants in Springville and Batavia, New York. The Lancaster High School Marching band has its prime season during the summer and fall months, when the students perform in the New York State Field Band Conference. The Lancaster High School Marching Band has been an active member of the New York State Field Band Conference since 1998, winning two state championships during that time. Those championships include the 2011 performance of Alfred Hitchcock's The Birds and the 2013 performance of A Soldier's Creed. In February 2014, the marching band was promoted to the top tier class of the Field Band Conference, the National Class. The Lancaster Marching Band has performed all over the country, including the AutoZone Liberty Bowl in Memphis, Tennessee; Walt Disney World Main Street USA parades in Orlando, Florida; the Gator Bowl in Jacksonville, Florida; Jacksonville Jaguars and Buffalo Bills halftime shows;Band of America (BOA) performances in Indianapolis, Indiana; and at the Pearl Harbor Memorial Parade in Waikiki, Hawaii. The Lancaster High School Marching Band will enter its 21st season in the New York State Field Band Conference with the show titled Into the Yonder Blue.

Academies
Lancaster High School contains eight academies, small learning communities that focus on a certain subject. Students apply for five of the academies halfway through their freshman year, while the sixth (Project Lead the Way) has entry requirements based entirely on academic performance in eighth grade. Students in an academy are required to take certain academy-based courses. Failing an academy course will result in expulsion from the academy.

Finance
The Academy of Finance focuses on accounting, banking, insurance, finance, and stock markets. Finance students are required to take a paid summer internship in the finance field between their junior and senior years. The Academy of Finance operates a satellite branch of Bank of Akron that is located at Lancaster High School. Finance students have the opportunity to earn college credit from Erie Community College. The Academy of Finance is a member of the National Academy Foundation. The Academy of Finance received the Aldo Papone award for excellence from NAF in 2010. Based on a leading internship program, the Academy of Finance received a $5000 award to continue promoting student excellence.

Hospitality and Tourism
The Academy of Hospitality and Tourism focuses on hospitality-based careers, such as the tourism and restaurant industries. Students are required to take an internship and familiarization tours of tourist destinations.

Health Careers
The Health Careers Academy focuses on healthcare related careers. Classes focus on health careers, medical terminology, ethics, anatomy, and physiology. Students in this academy visit medical facilities and meet with healthcare professionals. Students have the opportunity to earn college credit from Bryant and Stratton College, Erie Community College, Trocaire College, and Villa Maria College.

Leadership
The Leadership Academy focuses on developing leadership skills. Leadership students take courses that focus on communication skills, how to be an effective leader, and more.

Visual and Performing Arts
The Academy of the Visual and Performing Arts focuses on careers in the fields of visual arts and music.

Visual arts
The visual arts portion of the academy is focused on career exploration in fields such as art education, fashion design, photography, graphic design, advertising, and woodworking. Students take many art-focused classes culminating with a senior project that is exhibited.

Performing arts
The performing arts portion of the academy focuses on career exploration in fields such as music education, dance, and theatre. Students are required to be a member of a performing ensemble to remain in the academy, in addition to taking courses such as music theory. The academy culminates with a senior academy recital.

Project Lead the Way
Lancaster High School is a member of the national Project Lead the Way pre-engineering program. This program allows students to take engineering courses that can allow them to earn college credit from the Rochester Institute of Technology.  As of 2010, Lancaster offers six Project Lead the Way Courses.  These courses include Introduction to Engineering Design, Computer Integrated Manufacturing, Digital Electronics, Principles of Engineering, Biotechnical Engineering, and Engineering Design and Development.  Project Lead the Way is recommended by the United States Department of Education as an exemplary program, and is partnered with companies such as Autodesk, National Instruments, and Fischertechnik and sponsored by companies such as 3M, Intel, and Lockheed Martin. Project Lead the Way is a partner of the National Academy Foundation.

Clubs and activities
 Art Club
 Block L (Varsity Club)
 Varsity Jazz Ensemble
 Marching Band
 Chess Club
 DECA
 Design Club
 First Responders Club
 GSA – Gender-Sexuality Alliance (Formerly Gay/Straight Alliance)
 Impact Bible Club
 Science Olympiad – The team placed 4th among 28 teams at the 2011 Regional Competition, advancing the team to the 2011 State Finals at the United States Military Academy in West Point, New York.
 MasterMinds – a team that participates in a quiz-bowl like academic competition within New York
 Model UN
 Quill (literary magazine)
 Ski clubs
 Downhill
 Cross-Country
 Students Against Destructive Decisions
 Yearbook Club (Cayugan)
 video club

Athletics

Lancaster High School has teams in many sports, including baseball, American football, soccer, tennis, swimming, and basketball. The school's football team made it to the Section 6 Class AA championships in 2009, losing to 2009's eventual state champion, North Tonawanda High School. Len Jankiewicz ('69) was the Varsity football coach for 25 years, until the 2010 season. Coach "Jank" won the section VI championships in 1988 and 1999. In 2016 Eric Rupp became the head coach. Since then Lancaster has won the section VI championship title in 2016, 2017, 2018 and 2019. The school's rival is the Depew High School Wildcats, and the two varsity football teams meet every year for a non-league game as a part of the Great American Rivalry Series, presented by the US Army.

Redskins mascot 

For more than 60 years, the Redskin name had been a part of the Lancaster Central School District. But on March 16, 2015, the Lancaster School Board voted to discontinue the use of the nickname "Redskins". Starting in 2001, the U.S. Commission of Civil Rights advocated for non-Native American schools to avoid using images and references that could have a negative prejudice or bias against Native American people. With this, the Lancaster School District started to slowly phase out the Redskin name by doing things such as ordering uniform's without any reference to the mascot name. The school district than announced it would make a decision in the 2017–2018 school year, but this came with opposition as some people wanted this timeline to be accelerated. During the school's spring lacrosse season, the Akron, Niagara Wheatfield and Lake Shore school districts boycotted Lancaster lacrosse games due to a large amount of Native American athletes on each of their respective teams. Due to these actions, the Lancaster School Board decided to immediately make a decision regarding the district's mascot name. In reaction to this decision to change Redskin name, there were some protests, including one by students of the Lancaster School District. About 10% of the student body of the Lancaster School District participated in a walkout in response of the name change on March 19, 2015. These protests weren't successful as the district was dedicated to its decision. Although previously scheduled for May 27, on June 2 and 3 of 2015 the students of the Lancaster High School, Lancaster Middle School, and William Street School voted for the new mascot name. The students were given seven choices to vote on: the Lancaster Alphas, the Lancaster Dragons, the Lancaster Jaguars, the Lancaster Knights, the Lancaster Legends, the Lancaster Pride, and the Lancaster Red Hawks. With receiving 1,106 votes out of 3,072 total votes, it was announced on June 3 that the winning mascot name was the Lancaster Legends. The Legends logo was designed by an 8th grader named Korissa Gozdziak. To conclude this process, the Lancaster School Board finalized the new mascot name on June 8, 2015.

Alumni 
 Pat Dobson – baseball player
 Christopher A. Kojm – Deputy director of the 9/11 Commission; professor of international relations at George Washington University 
 Jim McCloskey – baseball player
 Jack Philips – baseball player
 Mary Saxer – pole vaulter
 Ryan Vinz – goalie
 Angela Wozniak – New York State legislator
 Leugim Castillo – baseball player

References

External links
School website
Lancaster Athletics

Public high schools in New York (state)
Educational institutions established in 1953
High schools in Erie County, New York
1953 establishments in New York (state)